Bergstrand is a lunar impact crater that lies on the far side of the Moon. It is located just to the southeast of the prominent crater Aitken, and northeast of the walled plain Vertregt.

The rim of Bergstrand is roughly circular, except along the southwest where the larger satellite crater Bergstrand Q intrudes into the outer wall. The outer wall of Bergstrand is otherwise only marginally worn, with one small craterlet overlaying the southern rim. The interior floor is fairly flat, with a few tiny craterlets.

Satellite craters
By convention these features are identified on lunar maps by placing the letter on the side of the crater midpoint that is closest to Bergstrand.

References

 
 
 
 
 
 
 
 
 
 
 
 

Impact craters on the Moon